The Hugo Award for Best Dramatic Presentation is given each year for theatrical films, television episodes, or other dramatized works related to science fiction or fantasy released in the previous calendar year. Originally the award covered both works of film and of television but since 2003, it has been split into two categories: Best Dramatic Presentation (Long Form) and Best Dramatic Presentation (Short Form). The Dramatic Presentation Awards are part of the broader Hugo Awards, which are given every year by the World Science Fiction Society for the best science fiction or fantasy works and achievements of the previous year. The awards are named after Hugo Gernsback, the founder of the first science fiction magazine, Amazing Stories, and was once officially known as the Science Fiction Achievement Award. The award has been described as "a fine showcase for speculative fiction".

History

The award was first presented in 1958, and with the exceptions of 1964 and 1966 was given annually through 2002 when it was retired in favor of the newly created Dramatic Presentation (Long Form) and Dramatic Presentation (Short Form) categories, which divided the category depending on whether the work was longer or shorter than 90 minutes. In the 1964 and 1966 awards there were insufficient nominations made to support the category. Prior to 1971, the category was defined as including works from "radio, television, stage or screen", and thereafter was expanded to "any medium of dramatized science fiction or fantasy", resulting in the nomination of recorded songs and other works. In addition to the regular Hugo awards, since 1996 Retrospective Hugo Awards, or "Retro Hugos", have been available to be awarded for years 50, 75, or 100 years prior in which no awards were given. To date, Retro Hugo awards have been awarded for 1939, 1941, 1943–1946, 1951, and 1954; the 1946 and 1951 awards were for the Best Dramatic Presentation category while the 1939, 1945, and 1954 awards were for the Short Form category. There were insufficient nominations to support an award in the Long Form category for those years. The 1941 and 1944 awards were for both Long and Short Form.

Hugo Award nominees and winners are chosen by supporting or attending members of the annual World Science Fiction Convention (Worldcon) and the presentation evening constitutes its central event. The selection process is defined in the World Science Fiction Society Constitution as instant-runoff voting with six nominees, except in the case of a tie. The works on the ballot are the six most-nominated by members that year, with no limit on the number of works that can be nominated. The 1958 awards did not include any recognition of runner-up magazines, but since 1959 all six candidates were recorded. Initial nominations are made by members in January through March, while voting on the ballot of six nominations is performed roughly in April through July, subject to change depending on when that year's Worldcon is held. Prior to 2017, the final ballot was five works; it was changed that year to six, with each initial nominator limited to five nominations, and no more than two works per series allowed on the final ballot. Worldcons are generally held near the start of September, and are held in a different city around the world each year. Members are permitted to vote "no award", if they feel that none of the nominees is deserving of the award that year, and in the case that "no award" takes the majority the Hugo is not given in that category. This has happened in the Dramatic Presentation category four times, in 1959, 1963, 1971, and 1977.

The award is typically for television and film presentations, but occasionally rewards works in other formats: in 1970 it was awarded to news coverage of the Apollo 11 moon landing, while in 1971 a concept album and a comedy album were nominated. Another comedy album was nominated the following year, and a slideshow was nominated in 1976. A radio play was nominated in 1979, and all of the 1939 Retro Hugo awards were for radio plays. In 2004, an acceptance speech from the 2003 MTV Movie Awards won the award, while in 2006, a skit from the opening of the previous year's award ceremony (pretending to be for the "Victor Hugo Award") was nominated. An audiobook was nominated in 2009, another acceptance speech was nominated in 2012, a concept album was nominated in 2017, and a song was nominated in 2018.

During the 72 nomination years, 43 awards for Best Dramatic Presentation, 21 awards each for Short Form and Long Form, and 11 Retro Hugo awards have been given. The individual franchises with the most awards are the revived 2000s-era Doctor Who with 6 Short Form awards out of 35 nominations, Star Wars with 3 Best Dramatic Presentation awards out of 3 nominations as well as 4 Long Form and 3 Short Form nominations, The Twilight Zone with 3 Best Dramatic Presentation awards out of 4 nominations, Game of Thrones with 3 wins out of a Long Form and 5 Short Form nominations, The Good Place with 4 wins out of 6 Short Form nominations. Other shows or series with multiple awards or nominations include the original Star Trek series with 2 wins out of 8 nominations, Star Trek: The Next Generation with 2 wins out of 3 nominations, The Expanse with 2 wins out of 5 Short Form nominations, and Babylon 5 with 2 wins out of 4 nominations. Less successful were the Marvel Cinematic Universe with 1 win out of 13 Long Form and 2 Short Form nominations, Buffy the Vampire Slayer with 1 out of 6, Battlestar Galactica (2004) with 1 of 5, and Harry Potter with no awards after 7 nominations. The members of the hip hop group Clipping are the only musical artists to have earned two nominations for their works, first for their 2016 album Splendor & Misery and then for their 2017 song "The Deep".

Winners and nominees 

In the following tables, the years correspond to the date of the ceremony, rather than when the work was first published. Entries with a blue background and an asterisk (*) next to the work's name have won the award; those with a white background are the nominees on the short-list. Entries with a gray background and a plus sign (+) mark a year when "no award" was selected as the winner. In the case of television presentations, the award is generally for a particular episode rather than for a program as a whole; however, sometimes, as in the case of The Twilight Zone, it was given for the series' body of work that year rather than for any particular episode.

1958–2002 

  *   Winner(s)
  +   No winner selected

2003–present 
Starting with the 2003 awards, the Dramatic Presentation award was split into two categories: Best Dramatic Presentation (Long Form) and Best Dramatic Presentation (Short Form). The Long Form award is for "a dramatized production in any medium, including film, television, radio, live theater, computer games or music. The work must last 90 minutes or longer (excluding commercials)" in the official Hugo Award rules.  The Short Form award is for "a dramatized production in any medium, including film, television, radio, live theater, computer games or music. The work must last less than 90 minutes (excluding commercials)" in the official Hugo Award rules. An individual work such as a television show can be nominated for a season in the Long Form category or for individual episodes in the Short Form, though not for both in the same year; as of 2017, a single show is additionally limited to two nominations in the Short Form category per year.

Long Form

Short Form

Retro Hugos 
Beginning with the 1996 Worldcon, the World Science Fiction Society created the concept of "Retro Hugos", in which the Hugo award could be retroactively awarded for 50, 75, or 100 years prior. Retro Hugos may only be awarded for years in which a Worldcon was hosted, but no awards were originally given. The 1939, 1941, and 1943—1945 awards were given 75 years later; the other three awards were given 50 years later. In 1946 and 1951, an award was given for Best Dramatic Presentation, as the category had not yet been split, while in 1939, 1943, 1945, and 1954 an award was given for Best Dramatic Presentation, Short Form. The Long Form category did not receive enough nominations for an award to be given in those years. The 1941 and 1944 Retro Hugos awarded both Long and Short Forms.

See also 
 Nebula Award for Best Script
 Ray Bradbury Award for Outstanding Dramatic Presentation
 List of joint winners of the Hugo and Nebula awards

Notes

References

External links 
 Hugo Award official site

Dramatic Presentation